Bastien Geiger (born 26 February 1985) is a Swiss former footballer.

Career 
After leaving from his contract with FC Sion on 27 November 2008, signed on 17 December 2008 a contract by Neuchâtel Xamax, he turned also back to his youth club.

In July 2012, Geiger joined Swiss Challenge League club Biel-Bienne on a one-year deal.

Personal life 
He is the son of Alain Geiger, who was part of the first Switzerland team to qualify for a World Cup since 1966 when they achieved qualification for the 1994 World Cup under coach Roy Hodgson.

References

External links
 
 

1985 births
Living people
Swiss men's footballers
Neuchâtel Xamax FCS players
FC Sion players
FC Biel-Bienne players
Association football defenders